Bobby Vee Meets The Crickets is a cross-over rock and roll album that brings singer Bobby Vee together with the Crickets. It was Vee's 6th album and The Crickets' second release following the departure and subsequent death of their front man, Buddy Holly.  The album contains new versions of three songs written by or recorded by Holly—Peggy Sue, Bo Diddley, and Well...All Right—and a host of cover versions of 1950s rock'n'roll songs by artists like Little Richard and Chuck Berry.  Originally released as an LP record on July 14, 1962, the album was re-released on CD in 1991, with bonus tracks not featured on the original album.

Background
After Buddy Holly's departure, The Crickets recorded with Earl Sinks serving as lead vocalist, with Crickets Jerry Allison and Sonny Curtis also sharing vocals. David Box also recorded a single as lead vocalist in 1959.  Several weeks after relocating to Los Angeles in 1960, guitarist and songwriter Sonny Curtis was drafted and began a two-year stint in the US Army,.  Curtis was stationed in Fort Ord and limited in his ability to continue working with the band. With Curtis away, Jerry Allison offered fellow Texan Jerry Naylor the position of lead singer with the group in 1961.  He would remain through early 1965.  Tommy Allsup, the guitarist who had toured with Holly during the fateful Winter Dance Party frequently played with the band.

Singing star and Liberty records artist Bobby Vee had a number of connections with Holly and the Crickets.  After Buddy Holly, Ritchie Valens and The Big Bopper were killed in the tragic February 1959 plane crash, Fargo, North Dakota teenager Bobby Vee was among several local young musicians recruited to join the rest of the Winter Dance Party tour, beginning with the next scheduled concert in Fargo.  Vee had recorded a hit version of The Crickets' song "More Than I Can Say" in 1961.

1991 CD Reissue
The 1991 CD re-release includes outtakes from the Crickets' studio sessions with Bobby Vee recorded during September 1962 and a medley of Buddy Holly songs recorded by Vee and the Crickets on April 16, 1989 and released as a single in 1990.

Track listing

Personnel 
 Bobby Vee -guitar, vocals
The Crickets
 Jerry Allison – drums, backing vocals 
NOTE: Though pictured on the front and back of the record jacket, neither Jerry Naylor and Joe B. Mauldin play on the record.  Mauldin left the group until the middle 1970s, and Naylor had only joined in the time for the album's release, becoming the band's lead singer from 1961 to 1965.
Additional personnel
 Tommy Allsup – guitar 
 Howard Roberts – piano (1, 2, 3, 17)
 Red Callender -bass
 Earl Palmer – drums
 Ernie Freeman - piano, arranger, conductor
 Gene Garf - piano
 Jim Economides - engineer
 Eddie Brackett - engineer
 Snuff Garrett - producer

References

External links

1962 albums
The Crickets albums
Bobby Vee albums
Liberty Records albums
Albums produced by Snuff Garrett